Killerspin is an American company that focuses on the table tennis market. Killerspin manufactures tables, rackets, and balls. It is a part of sponsoring and hosting several competitions, as well as table tennis related special events. Killerspin equipment and products are distributed in fourteen countries on five separate continents.

Events
The company has hosted the largest table tennis events ever held in the United States, including the: 
Extreme Table Tennis Championship
Spinvitational Table Tennis Championship
Arnold Classic Table Tennis Challenge
Mohegan Sun Table Tennis Championship.

These competitions are often aired nationally on ESPN.

Killerspin Krew

Killerspin boasts an impressive team of endorsed players from across the globe.  The ‘Killerspin Krew’ has dominated American table tennis, achieving numerous titles including winning every spot on the US Men's Table Tennis Team.  Current team members include:
Biba Golić
Aleksandar Karakašević
Chen Qi
Saša Drinić
Ilija Lupulesku
Mark Hazinski
Andrei Filimon
Eric Owens
Georgina Pota
Adam Hugh
Elie
Barney Reed

Affiliates
On October 13, 2008, The National Collegiate Table Tennis Association announced its exclusive Table Tennis Equipment Partnership with Killerspin for the duration of three years. Killerspin will provide balls and barriers to 17 NCTTA Divisions throughout the country. With this agreement Killerspin became the official equipment supplier for College Table Tennis.

Marketing
Killerspin has been involved with televised table tennis competitions that have been broadcast on Fox Sports Net and ESPN worldwide.  Killerspin also produces both instructional and event-based table tennis DVDs for consumers.

Killerspin products have been featured in television programs including MTV's Real World, The Simple Life, and HGTV’s Don't Sweat It. Additionally, Killerspin gear and sponsored players were highlighted in the Hollywood feature film, Balls of Fury, and the independent film Ping Pong Playa.

References

External links
 

Sporting goods manufacturers of the United States
Manufacturing companies based in Chicago